Ontario is an unincorporated community in Lima Township, LaGrange County, Indiana.

History
Ontario was laid out in 1837. The community took its name from Lake Ontario. A post office opened at Ontario in 1846, and remained in operation until it was discontinued in 1943.

Geography

References

Unincorporated communities in LaGrange County, Indiana
Unincorporated communities in Indiana